Simos Simopoulos (died 25 September 2020) was a Greek politician who served as Minister of infrastructure and Transport in the Caretaker Cabinet of Panagiotis Pikrammenos and as Rector of the National Technical University of Athens from 2010 to 2014.

References

Date of birth missing
2020 deaths
Place of birth missing
Year of birth missing
Place of death missing
Greek politicians